Thospia trifasciella is a species of snout moth in the genus Thospia. It was described by Ragonot in 1887. It is found in China and Uzbekistan.

References

Moths described in 1887
Phycitini